The Grapple on the Gridiron was a college wrestling dual meet held on November 14, 2015, in Iowa City, Iowa. Historical rivals Oklahoma State University and University of Iowa. A record 42,287 fans attended the meet, held outdoors at the Kinnick Stadium, normally the home of Iowa's football program. The meet marked the first time two college teams wrestled in a football stadium  and the first time an NCAA Division I football stadium had hosted wrestling match.

References

Amateur wrestling